Giovanni Gabrieli (c. 1554/1557 – 12 August 1612) was an Italian composer and organist. He was one of the most influential musicians of his time, and represents the culmination of the style of the Venetian School, at the time of the shift from Renaissance to Baroque idioms.

Biography
Gabrieli was born in Venice. He was one of five children, and his father came from the region of Carnia and went to Venice shortly before Giovanni's birth. While not much is known about Giovanni's early life, he probably studied with his uncle, the composer Andrea Gabrieli, who was employed at St Mark's Basilica from the 1560s until his death in 1585. Giovanni may indeed have been brought up by his uncle, as is implied by the dedication to his 1587 book of concerti, in which he described himself as "little less than a son" to his uncle.

Giovanni also went to Munich to study with the renowned Orlando de Lassus at the court of Duke Albert V; most likely he stayed there until about 1579. Lassus was to be one of the principal influences on the development of his musical style.

By 1584 he had returned to Venice, where he became principal organist at St Mark's Basilica in 1585, after Claudio Merulo left the post; following his uncle's death the following year he took the post of principal composer as well. Also after his uncle's death he began editing much of the older man's music, which would otherwise have been lost; Andrea evidently had had little inclination to publish his own music, but Giovanni's opinion of it was sufficiently high that he devoted much of his own time to compiling and editing it for publication.

Gabrieli's career rose further when he took the additional post of organist at the Scuola Grande di San Rocco, another post he retained for his entire life. San Rocco was the most prestigious and wealthy of all the Venetian confraternities, and second only to San Marco itself in the splendor of its musical establishment. Some of the most renowned singers and instrumentalists in Italy performed there and a vivid description of its musical activity survives in the travel memoirs of the English writer Thomas Coryat. Much of his music was written specifically for that location, although he probably composed even more for San Marco.

San Marco had a long tradition of musical excellence and Gabrieli's work there made him one of the most noted composers in Europe. The vogue that began with his influential volume Sacrae symphoniae (1597) was such that composers from all over Europe, especially from Germany, came to Venice to study. Evidently he also instructed his new pupils to study the madrigals being written in Italy, so not only did they carry back the grand Venetian polychoral style to their home countries, but also the more intimate style of madrigals; Heinrich Schütz and others helped transport the transitional early Baroque music north to Germany, a trend that decisively affected subsequent music history. The productions of the German Baroque, culminating in the music of J.S. Bach, were founded on this strong tradition, which had its roots in Venice.

Gabrieli was increasingly ill after about 1606, at which time church authorities began to appoint deputies to take over duties he could no longer perform. He died in 1612 in Venice, of complications from a kidney stone.

Music and style

Though Gabrieli composed in many of the forms current at the time, he preferred sacred vocal and instrumental music. All of his secular vocal music is relatively early in his career; he never wrote lighter forms, such as dances; and later he concentrated on sacred vocal and instrumental music that exploited sonority for maximum effect. Among the innovations credited to him – and while he was not always the first to use them, he was the most famous of his period to do so – were dynamics; specifically notated instrumentation (as in the famous Sonata pian' e forte); and massive forces arrayed in multiple, spatially separated groups, an idea which was to be the genesis of the Baroque concertato style, and which spread quickly to northern Europe, both by the report of visitors to Venice and by Gabrieli's students, which included Hans Leo Hassler and Heinrich Schütz.

Like composers before and after him, he would use the unusual layout of the San Marco church, with its two choir lofts facing each other, to create striking spatial effects. Most of his pieces are written so that a choir or instrumental group will first be heard on one side, followed by a response from the musicians on the other side; often there was a third group situated on a stage near the main altar in the center of the church. While this polychoral style had been extant for decades (Adrian Willaert may have made use of it first, at least in Venice), Gabrieli pioneered the use of carefully specified groups of instruments and singers, with precise directions for instrumentation, and in more than two groups. The acoustics were and are such in the church that instruments, correctly positioned, could be heard with perfect clarity at distant points. Thus instrumentation which looks strange on paper, for instance a single string player set against a large group of brass instruments, can be made to sound, in San Marco, in perfect balance. A fine example of these techniques can be seen in the scoring of In Ecclesiis.

Gabrieli's first motets were published alongside his uncle Andrea's compositions in his 1587 volume of Concerti. These pieces show much influence of his uncle's style in the use of dialogue and echo effects. There are low and high choirs and the difference between their pitches is marked by the use of instrumental accompaniment. The motets published in Giovanni's 1597 Sacrae Symphoniae seem to move away from this technique of close antiphony towards a model in which musical material is not simply echoed, but developed by successive choral entries. Some motets, such as Omnes Gentes developed the model almost to its limits. In these motets, instruments are an integral part of the performance, and only the choirs marked "Capella" are to be performed by singers for each part.

There seems to be a distinct change in Gabrieli's style after 1605, the year of publication of Monteverdi's Quinto libro di madrigali, and Gabrieli's compositions are in a much more homophonic style as a result. There are sections purely for instruments – called "Sinfonia" – and small sections for soloists singing florid lines, accompanied simply by a basso continuo. "Alleluia" refrains provide refrains within the structure, forming rondo patterns in the motets, with close dialogue between choirs and soloists.
In particular, one of his best-known pieces, In Ecclesiis, is a showcase of such polychoral techniques, making use of four separate groups of instrumental and singing performers, underpinned by the omnipresent organ and continuo.

Works

Concerti (1587)
'Concerti di Andrea, et di Giovanni Gabrieli, organisti della Serenissima Signori di Venetia': A collection of 77 works, the majority of which are by the uncle, Andrea Gabrieli, but also containing some of the younger Gabrieli's polychoral motets. 
9.) 	Inclina Domine aurem a 6
19.) 	Ego dixi Domine a 7
33.) 	O magnum mysterium a 8
37.) 	Deus meus ad te de luce a 10
40.) 	Angelus ad pastores ait a 12
77.) 	Sacri di Giove augei a 12

Sacrae Symphoniae (1597)
A collection of: 45 motets for 6, 7, 8, 10, 12, 14, 15 or 16 voices; 14 canzonas in 8, 10, 12 or 15 musical lines; and two sonatas, one in 8 musical lines, the other in 12.
 Motet "Cantate Domino" a 6, Ch.6
 Exaudi Domine, justitiam meam, Ch.7
 Motet "Beata es virgo Maria" a 6, Ch.8
 Motet "Miserere mei Deus" (Psalm 51) a 6, Ch.9
 O quam suavis est, Domine, Ch.10
 Benedixisti Domine terram tuam, Ch.11
 Motet "Exaudi Deus orationem meam" (Psalm 55) a 7, Ch.12
 Motet "Sancta Maria succurre miseris" a 7, Ch.13
 O Domine Jesu Christe, Ch.14
 Domine exaudi orationem meam, Ch.15
 Jubilate Deo, omnis terr, Ch.16
 Misericordias Domin, Ch.17
 Beati immaculati, Ch.18
 Laudate nomen Domini, Ch.19
 Jam non-dicam vos servos, Ch.20
 Beati omnes, Ch.21
 Domine, Dominus noster, Ch.22
 Angelus Domini descendit, Ch.23
 Motet "O Jesu mi dulcissime" a 8, Ch.24
 Motet "Sancta et immaculata virginitas" a 8, Ch.25
 Diligam te, Domine, Ch.26
 Exultate justi in Domino, Ch.27
 Hoc tegitur, Ch.28
 Ego sum qui sum, Ch.29
 In te Domine speravi, Ch.30
 Jubilemus singuli, Ch.31
 Magnificat, Ch.32
 Canzon per sonar primi toni a 8, Ch.170
 Canzon per sonar septimi toni a 8, Ch.171
 Canzon per sonar septimi toni a 8, Ch.172
 Canzon per sonar noni toni a 8, Ch.173
 Canzon per sonar duodecimi toni a 8, Ch.174
 Sonata pian e forte, Ch.175
 Benedicam Dominum, Ch.33
 Domine exaudi orationem meam, Ch.34
 Motet "Maria virgo" a 10, Ch.35
 Motet "Deus qui beatum Marcum" a 10, Ch.36
 Surrexit Pastor bonus, Ch.37
 Judica me, Domine, Ch.38
 Quis est iste qui venit, Ch.39
 Motet "Hodie Christus natus est" a 10, Ch.40
 Canzon per sonar primi toni a 10, Ch.176
 Canzon per sonar duodecimi toni a 10, Ch.177
 Canzon per sonar duodecimi toni a 10, Ch.178
 Canzon per sonar duodecimi toni a 10, Ch.179
 Canzon in echo duodecimi toni à 10, Ch.180
 Canzon sudetta accommodata per concertar con l’Organo a 10, Ch.181
 Plaudite, psallite, jubilate Deo omnis terra, Ch.41
 Virtute magna, Ch.42
 Kyrie (primus), Ch.43
 Christe, Ch.44
 Kyrie (tertius), Ch.45 (Ch.43–45 are a single composition)
 Gloria, Ch.46
 Sanctus, Ch.47
 Magnificat, Ch.48
 Regina cœli, lætare, Ch.49
 Canzon per sonar septimi & octavi toni a 12, Ch.182
 Canzon per sonar noni toni a 12, Ch.183
 Sonata octavi toni a 12, Ch.184
 Nunc dimittis, Ch.50
 Jubilate Deo, omnis terra, Ch.51
 Canzon quarti toni a 15, Ch.185
 Omnes gentes plaudite manibus, Ch.52

Canzoni per sonare (1608)
A collection of 36 short works by Gabrieli, Girolamo Frescobaldi, and others. The first four and the 27th and 28th are by Gabrieli.
 Canzon (I) a 4 "La spiritata", Ch.186
 Canzon (II) a 4, Ch.187
 Canzon (III) a 4, Ch.188
 Canzon (IV) a 4, Ch.189
 Canzon (XXVII) a 8 "Fa sol la re", Ch.190
 Canzon (XXVIII) a 8 "Sol sol la sol fa mi", Ch.191

Canzoni e Sonate (written nlt. 1612, publ. 1615)
Collection of 16 canzoni and 5 sonate for 3, 5, 6, 7, 8, 10, 12, 14, 15 and 22 "voci, per sonar con ogni sorte di instrumenti, con il basso per l’organo (musical parts, to sound on all sorts of instruments, with bass by means of the organ)”. Published posthumously in 1615. (†)Note that numbering as published (Roman system) does not quite agree with the Charteris catalogue.
 Canzon prima (item I) a 5, Ch.195
 Canzon (II) a 6, Ch.196
 Canzon (III) a 6, Ch.197
 Canzon (IV) a 6, Ch.198
 Canzon (V) a 7, Ch.199
 Canzon (VI) a 7, Ch.200
 Canzon (VII) a 7, Ch.201
 Canzon (VIII) a 8, Ch.202
 Canzon (IX)† a 8
 Canzon (X)† a 8
 Canzon (XI)† a 8
 Canzon (XII) a 8, Ch.205
 Sonata (item XIII) a 8, Ch.206
 Canzon (item XIV) a 10, Ch.207
 Canzon (XV) a 10, Ch.208
 Canzon (XVI) a 12, Ch.209
 Canzon (XVII) a 12, Ch.210
 Sonata (item XVIII) a 14, Ch.211
 Sonata (XIX) a 15, Ch.212
 Sonata (XX) a 22, Ch.213
 Sonata (XXI) per tre violini e basso (a 4), Ch.214

Sacrae Symphoniae II (written nlt. 1612, publ. 1615)
Sacrae symphoniae Liber secundus. Published posthumously in 1615.

 Exultavit cor meum
 Congratulamini mihi
 Ego dixi Domine
 Sancta et immaculata
 O Jesu mi dulcissime
 Hodie completi sunt
 O quam suavis
 Deus in nomine tuo
 Attendite popule meus
 Cantate Domino
 Benedictus es Dominus
 Litania Beatae Mariae Virginis
 Deus Deus meus
 Vox Domini
 Iubilate Deo
 Motet "Surrexit Christus" a 11, Ch.66
 Exaudi Deus
 O gloriosa virgo
 Misericordia tua Domine
 Suscipe clementissime Deus
 Kyrie
 Sanctus
 Magnificat 12 vocum
 Confitebor tibi Domine
 Motet "Quem vidistis pastores" a 14
 Motet "In ecclesiis" a 14
 Magnificat 14 vocum
 Salvator noster
 O quam gloriosa
 Exaudi me Domine
 Magnificat 17 vocum
 Buccinate

References

Further reading
Arnold, Denis. Giovanni Gabrieli and the Music of the Venetian High Renaissance.  London: Oxford University Press, 1979.  
Arnold, Denis. Monteverdi.  London, J.M. Dent & Sons Ltd, 1975.  
Arnold, Denis. "Giovanni Gabrieli," in The New Grove Dictionary of Music and Musicians, ed. Stanley Sadie.  20 vol.  London, Macmillan Publishers Ltd., 1980.  
Bartlett, Clifford & Holman, Peter. Giovanni Gabrieli: A Guide to the Performance of His Instrumental Music. In Early Music, Vol. 3, No. 1 (Jan. 1975), pp. 25–32.
Bryant, David. "Gabrieli, Giovanni." In Grove Music Online. Oxford Music Online, http://www.oxfordmusiconline.com/subscriber/article/grove/music/40693 (accessed 22 September 2009).
Bukofzer, Manfred. Music in the Baroque Era. New York, W.W. Norton & Co., 1947. 
Charteris, Richard. Giovanni Gabrieli (ca. 1555–1612): a Thematic Catalogue of his Music with a Guide to the Source Materials and Translations of his Vocal Texts. New York, 1996.
Grout, Donald Jay. A History of Western Music. W.W. Norton & Co., 1980. 
Kenton, Egon. Life and Works of Giovanni Gabrieli. American Institute of Musicology, 1967 (Armen Carapetyen).
Ongaro, Giulio, et al. "Venice." In Grove Music Online. Oxford Music Online, http://www.oxfordmusiconline.com/subscriber/article/grove/music/41311 (accessed 22 September 2009).
Reese, Gustave. Music in the Renaissance. New York, W.W. Norton & Co., 1954. 
Selfridge-Field, Eleanor,Venetian Instrumental Music, from Gabrieli to Vivaldi.  New York, Dover Publications, 1994.

External links

  

Listen to  free recordings of songs from Umeå Akademiska Kör.

1550s births
1612 deaths
17th-century Italian composers
16th-century Venetian people
17th-century Venetian people
Renaissance composers
Venetian School (music) composers
Italian Baroque composers
Italian classical musicians
Italian male classical composers
Burials at Santo Stefano (church)
Pupils of Andrea Gabrieli
Pupils of Orlande de Lassus
17th-century male musicians